Sergei Sergeevich Bubka (born 10 February 1987) is a Ukrainian former professional tennis player. He was a member of the Ukraine Davis Cup team and was coached by Tibor Toth, who is also the former coach of Sergiy Stakhovsky. Bubka is the son of pole vaulter Sergey Bubka.

On 1 November 2012, Sergei Bubka was seriously injured in a fall from the third floor of an apartment building in Paris. He returned to play tennis in February 2014.

Career summary
Sergei's biggest success so far in his career was beating the 5th-seeded Ivan Ljubičić in the first round of the 2011 Dubai Tennis Championships. He also hit a 157 MPH serve during qualifying for the 2011 US Open, which would have been the record had the serve not been out.

ATP Challenger and ITF Futures titles

Singles: 2 
{|
|-valign=top
|

Doubles: 7 
{|
|-valign=top
|

References

External links
 
 
 

1987 births
Living people
Ukrainian male tennis players
Sportspeople from Donetsk